"Purple Funk" is a 2017 song by Mothers Favorite Child featuring singer CeCe Peniston, released as a music download, as well on CD single, distributed through the band's own label MFC in association with Reel People Music on June 22, 2017.

Credits and personnel
 Paris Toon - co-writer, programmer, engineer, producer
 Cecilia Peniston - lead vocals, co-writer , producer
 Whitney Jones - back vocals, co-writer 
 Eloni Yawn - back vocals, co-writer 
 Richard Simpson - co-writer/rap 
 Maurice Joshua - co-writer , programmer
 Ted Belledin - co-writer , programmer
 Roger Dryer - bass
 Dan Petrosino - drums
 John Blackwell - drums, remix 
 Kent Phillips - engineer 
 Kathleen Dyson - guitar, remix 
 Kolton Lee - guitar
 Tyrone Chase - guitar
 JWhite - horns
 Tenth Month - programmer
 Desert Rock - remix 
 Mike Patto  - remix 
 Oli Lazarus  - remix 
 Tom Davidson  - remix

Track listing and format

 MD, #RPM066
 "Purple Funk" - 6:10
 "Purple Funk (Reel People Remix)" - 7:19
 "Purple Funk (Reel People Dub)" - 6:24
 "Purple Funk (Reel People Instrumental Remix)" - 7:19

 MD, AAC
 "Purple Funk (Radio Edit)" - 4:01
 "Purple Funk (Blackwell Extended Mix)" - 6:05
 "Purple Funk (Instrumental) - 6:07"
 "Wish (Kat Dyson Mix)" - 3:17

 CDS
 "Purple Funk (Radio Edit)" - 4:01
 "Purple Funk (Blackwell Extended Mix)" - 6:05
 "Purple Funk (Instrumental) - 6:07"
 "Wish (Kat Dyson Mix)" - 3:17
 "Wish (Desert Rock Mix)" - 3:26┼

 ┼ denotes a hidden track

Charts

Weekly charts

References

General

 Specific

External links 
 

2017 singles
CeCe Peniston songs
2017 songs
House music songs